The 2022–23 Pac-12 Conference women's basketball season will begin with practices in October followed by the 2022–23 NCAA Division I women's basketball season which will start in November 2022. Conference play will begin in December 2022. This will be the eleventh season under the Pac–12 Conference name and the 37th since the conference first sponsored women's sports, including basketball, in the 1986–87 school year.

The Pac-12 tournament will take place in March 2023 at the Michelob Ultra Arena in Paradise, Nevada.

Pre-season

Recruiting classes

Preseason watchlists
Below is a table of notable preseason watch lists.

Preseason polls

Pac-12 Media days
The Pac-12 will conduct its 2022 Pac-12 media days at the Pac-12 Studio, in San Francisco, California, on October 25, 2022 (Pac-12 Network).

The teams and representatives in respective order were as follows:

 Pac-12 Commissioner – George Kliavkoff
 Deputy Commissioner and Chief Operating Officer (WBB) – Jamie Zaninovich
 Arizona – Adia Barnes (HC), Shaina Pellington & Helena Pueyo
 Arizona State – Natasha Adair (HC), Sydney Erikstrup & Jaddan Simmons
 California – Charmin Smith (HC), Jayda Curry & Kemery Martín
 Colorado – JR Payne (HC), Quay Miller & Jaylyn Sherrod 
 Oregon – Kelly Graves (HC), Te-Hina Paopao & Endyia Rogers
 Oregon State – Scott Rueck (HC), Talia von Oelhoffen & Bendu Yeaney 
 Stanford – Tara VanDerveer (HC), Cameron Brink & Haley Jones
 UCLA – Cori Close (HC), Charisma Osborne & Kiki Rice
 USC – Lindsay Gottlieb (HC), Rayah Marshall & Kadi Sissoko  
 Utah – Lynne Roberts (HC), Gianna Kneepkens & Kennady McQueen  
 Washington – Tina Langley (HC), Lauren Schwartz & Haley Van Dyke  
 Washington State – Kamie Ethridge (HC), Charlisse Leger-Walker & Bella Murekatete

 

Source:

Pac-12 Preseason All-Conference
 

Honorable Mention Treasure Hunt (ASU); Evelien Lutje Schipholt (CAL); Rayah Marshall (USC); Leilani McIntosh (CAL); Kennady McQueen (UTAH); Quay Miller (COLO); Bella Murekatete (WSU); Kiki Rice (UCLA); Jaddan Simmons (ASU); Haley Van Dyke (WASH); Kindyll Wetta (COLO).

†Sedona Prince suffered a season ending elbow injury on October 28th and chose to exhaust her remaining NCAA eligibility and pursue a professional basketball career.

Source:

Midseason watchlists
Below is a table of notable midseason watch lists.

Final watchlists
Below is a table of notable year end watch lists.

Regular season
The Schedule will be released in late October. Before the season, it was announced that for the seventh consecutive season, all regular season conference games and conference tournament games would be broadcast nationally by ESPN Inc. family of networks including ABC, ESPN, ESPN2 and ESPNU, and the Pac-12 Network.

Early season tournaments

Records against other conferences
2022–23 records against non-conference foes for the 2022–23 season. Records shown for regular season only.

Regular Season

Post Season

Record against ranked non-conference opponents
This is a list of games against ranked opponents only (rankings from the AP Poll):

Pac-12/SWAC Legacy Series
On September 20th, 2021 the Pac-12 and Southwestern Athletic Conference will debut the Pac-12/SWAC Legacy Series, an educational and basketball scheduling partnership between the two collegiate athletics conferences, to tip off the 2022-23 season. The Legacy Series will incorporate an array of educational opportunities for competing teams and student-athletes featuring expert speakers and prominent alumni, community engagement, campus traditions, historic site visits, and book/film discussions.  The Pac-12 won every game in the series, finishing with a 6−0 record against the SWAC schools.

Team rankings are reflective of AP poll when the game was played, not current or final ranking

† denotes game was played on neutral site

Conference schedule
This table summarizes the head-to-head results between teams in conference play.

Points scored

Through February 27, 2023

Rankings

Head coaches

Coaching changes

Coaches
Note: Stats shown are before the beginning of the season. Pac-12 records are from time at current school.

Notes:
 Pac-12 records, conference titles, etc. are from time at current school and are through the end the 2022–23 season.
 NCAA tournament appearances are from time at current school only.
 NCAA Final Fours and Championship include time at other schools

Post season

Pac-12 tournament

The conference tournament will be played in March 2023 at the Michelob Ultra Arena in Paradise, NV. The top four teams will have a bye on the first day. Teams will be seeded by conference record, with ties broken by record between the tied teams followed by record against the regular-season champion, if necessary.

NCAA tournament

Teams from the conference that will be selected to participate:

Women's National Invitation Tournament 
Members from the conference that will be selected to participate:

Awards and honors

Players of the Week 
Throughout the regular season, the Pac-12 offices will honor 2 players based on performance by naming them player of the week and freshman of the week.

Totals per School

All-Americans

All-District
The United States Basketball Writers Association (USBWA) named the following from the Pac-12 to their All-District Teams:

District VIII

All-District Team

District IX
Player of the Year

All-District Team

Conference awards
The Pac-12 presents two separate sets of major awards—one voted on by conference coaches and the other by media.

Individual awards
Sources:

Coaches

Media
Sources:

All-Pac-12

First Team

 ‡ Pac-12 Player of the Year
 †††† four-time All-Pac-12 First Team honoree
 ††† three-time All-Pac-12 First Team honoree
 †† two-time All-Pac-12 First Team honoree
 † two-time All-Pac-12 honoree

Honorable Mention
Jayda Curry, CAL; Dalayah Daniels; WASH; Frida Formann, COLO; Jenna Johnson, UTAH; Esmery Martinez, ARIZ; Leilani McIntosh, CAL; Kennady McQueen, UTAH; Bella Murekatete, WSU; Te-Hina Paopao, ORE; Lauren Schwartz, WASH; Tyi Skinner, ASU; Haley Van Dyke, WASH; Grace VanSlooten, ORE; Aaronette Vonleh, COLO; Talia von Oelhoffen, OSU

All-Freshman Team

† Pac-12 Player of the Year
‡ Pac-12 Freshman of the Year
Honorable Mention
Lauren Betts, STAN; Timea Gardiner, OSU; Elle Ladine, WASH; Talana Lepolo, STAN; Astera Tuhina, WSU

All-Defensive Team

† Pac-12 Player of the Year
‡Pac-12 Defensive Player of the Year
†† two-time Pac-12 All-Defensive Team honoree
Honorable Mention
Okako Adika, USC; Chance Gray, ORE; Charlisse Leger-Walker, WSU; Jelena Mitrovic, OSU; Jayda Noble, WASH; Charisma Osborne, UCLA; Jaddan Simmons, ASU; Kayla Williams, USC

Scholar Athlete of the year
The Pac-12 moved to seasonal Academic Honor Rolls, discontinuing sport-by-sport teams, starting in 2019-20

National awards

2022–23 Season statistic leaders

Team statistic rankings

2023 WNBA draft

Home game attendance 

Bold – At or exceed capacity
†Season high

See also
2022–23 Pac-12 Conference men's basketball season

References